Jean-Baptiste Duvernoy (c. 1802 – c. 1880) was a French pianist and composer of the Romantic period. He is best known for his Elementary Studies, Op. 176, designed to improve finger co-ordination. He is also known for The School of Mechanism, Op. 120.

Duvernoy also wrote many other studies designed to help finger co-ordination.

References

External links
 

1802 births
1880 deaths
People from Nièvre
19th-century classical composers
19th-century French male classical pianists
19th-century French composers
French male classical composers
French Romantic composers